Destroyer of Worlds is a science fiction novel  by American writer Larry Niven and Edward M. Lerner, set in the Known Space series. It is a sequel to their previous novels, Fleet of Worlds and Juggler of Worlds. It is set ten years after Juggler of Worlds, drawing heavily from Protector, but, like the rest of the series, can stand alone.

The plot involves New Terra and the Puppeteers (and the Gw'oth) entering into conflict with a Pak Protector fleet (though not the fleets featured in Protector). It also resolves why Alice Jordan's knowledge about the Pak never entered later novels, and restates the known timeline of the Home conversion to a planet of Protectors.

References

2009 American novels
Known Space stories
Collaborative novels
Novels by Larry Niven
2009 science fiction novels
American science fiction novels
Tor Books books